Akhfenir Wind Farm is located in 15 km from Akhfenir and 100 km from Tarfaya in Morocco and a has a total installed capacity of 200 MW. It is owned by Nareva, a subsidiary of SNI the holding company Mohammed VI. The first 100MW wind turbines were supplied by Alstom and the contract for the extension of the capacity to 200MW was awarded to General Electric.

See also 

 List of wind farms in Morocco

References 

Energy infrastructure completed in 2013
Wind farms in Morocco
21st-century architecture in Morocco